This is a listing of the French records in swimming. They are the fastest times ever swum by a swimmer representing France (or one of its outlying areas) in both 50 m and 25 m swimming courses.

The records are maintained/recognized by France's national swimming federation: Fédération Française de Natation (FFN).

Long course (50 m)

Men

Women

Mixed relay

Short course (25 m)

Men

Women

Mixed relay

References
General
French Long Course Records 26 December 2022 updated
French Short Course Records 26 December 2022 updated
Specific

External links
FFN web site

France
Records
Swimming
Swimming